Live at Celebrity Hall (also titled as Live at the Celebrity Hall and the Metro Club) is a live album recorded and released in 1987 by the Washington, D.C.-based go-go band Rare Essence. The album was recorded live at the now defunct music venues Celebrity Hall (also referred to as "The Black Hole") and at Breeze's Metro Club, both located in Washington, D.C. This album follows their 1986 live album Live at Breeze's Metro Club and includes the singles "Still Gettin' Buzy", "Whip It", and a go-go rendition of Kool Moe Dee's song "Do You Know What Time It Is?".

Track listing
Side A – Live at Celebrity Hall
 R.E. Herman 2x – 6:54
 Still Gettin' Buzy – 7:39
 Whip It – 7:06

Side B – Live at the Metro Club
 Uptown – 5:02
 Do You Know What Time It Is? (written by Moe Dewese) – 5:13
 Iko-Iko (written by Barbara Anne Hawkins, Rosa Lee Hawkins, Joan Marie Johnson, Sharon Jones) – 5:48

Personnel
 James "Jas Funk" Thomas – lead vocals
 Quentin "Footz" Davidson – drums
 Milton "Go-Go Mickey" Freeman – congas, percussion
 Michael "Funky Ned" Neal – bass guitar
 Andre "Whiteboy" Johnson – electric guitar
 Byron "B.J." Jackson – keyboards
 John "J.B." Buchanan – keyboards, flugelhorn
 Donnell Floyd – saxophone
 David Green – timbales, backing vocals
 Derek Paige – trumpet

References

External links
 Live at the Celebrity Hall at Discogs.com

1987 live albums
Rare Essence albums
Live rhythm and blues albums